Unwritten is the debut studio album by English singer and songwriter Natasha Bedingfield. It was released in Europe on 6 September 2004 through Phonogenic Records and in the United States on 2 August 2005 through Epic Records. A pop and R&B album, Unwritten was produced by a number of producers, including Danielle Brisebois, Guy Chambers, Peter Wade Keusch, Steve Kipner, Patrick Leonard and Greg Wells.

In the United Kingdom, Unwritten topped both the UK Albums Chart and the Scottish Albums Chart, receiving a triple platinum certification from the British Phonographic Industry for sales of over a million copies in the United Kingdom. In North America, it peaked at number twenty-six on the US Billboard 200 and was certified gold by the RIAA for shipments of over 500,000 copies in the United States. The album spawned four singles: "Single", "These Words", "Unwritten" and  "I Bruise Easily" from the 2006 reissue. The song "Drop Me in the Middle" featured rapper Bizarre on the international editions of the album, and English rapper and singer Estelle on the US editions. In 2006, the album was re-released in North America with new cover artwork and a slightly altered track listing, including "The One That Got Away".

Critical reception

The album received generally positive reviews from critics. Earning a 7 out of 10 from PopMatters, Adrien Begrand, who said the album was Bedingfield's "brand of clever, R&B infused pop." Though, he went on to admit that the album was "not without its pitfalls." David Hooper from the BBC gave the album another positive review, writing "there's no denying this is a finely-crafted number with bold, voluptuous harmonies. It's guaranteed to thrill, at least for the first 30 plays." Further, Hollow stated "Unwritten is a textbook quality pop album, lifted by Natasha's strong voice, immaculate production and some absolutely corking singles. Whether you like it or not, you won't be able to get those tunes out of your head."

UK-based music review website musicOMH critic David Welsh praised the album, compared Bedingfield's success to that of her brother, calling the album "a startlingly accomplished debut outing, letting the whole world know that Daniel is by no means the only talented Bedingfield out there." Welsh continued to add that Unwritten was "both musically note-worthy and lyrically substantial", concluding that there was "no shame in adding this to your collection."

Commercial performance
Unwritten peaked at number one on the Official Charts Company's UK Albums Chart. It sold over one million copies in the United Kingdom, being certified triple platinum by the British Phonographic Industry (BPI). In the United States, it peaked at number 26 on the US Billboard 200 with first week sales of 34,000. Its currently certified gold from the Recording Industry Association of America (RIAA). In Australia, it peaked at number 89 on ARIA Albums Chart. It also peaked at number 26 in Austria, number 20 in Germany, number 33 in Mexico and number 23 in Switzerland, making smaller impact outside the United Kingdom and the United States.

Track listing

Notes
Japanese edition features a booklet with the Japanese lyrics and obi strip.

Personnel
Natasha Bedingfield – primary artist, lead vocals, background vocals, songwriting, vocal arrangements
Keith Andes – additional keyboards ("Drop Me in the Middle")
Dave Catlin-Birch – bass ("Silent Movie")
Guy Chambers – guitar, keyboards, producer
Justin Clayton  – bass ("Peace of Me")
Larry Corbett – cello ("Peace of Me")
Keith Crouch – Hammond B-3 organ ("Unwritten")
Paul Gordon – keyboards ("We're All Mad")
Nick Ingman – string arrangements, conductor
Patrick Leonard – music programming, keyboards ("Peace of Me")
David Low – cello ("Stumble")
Tim Pierce – guitar ("Peace of Me")
Robbie Campos	– guitar, keyboards
Michele Richards – violin ("Peace of Me")
Josephina Vergara – violin ("Peace of Me")
Greg Wells – bass, guitar, piano, drums
Joey Waronker - drums ("Peace of Me")
Danielle Brisebois – background vocals ("Unwritten"), producer, vocal arrangements
Jessica Collins – background vocals ("Unwritten" and "Drop Me in the Middle")
Nikola Bedingfield – background vocals ("Unwritten" and "Drop Me in the Middle")
Ryan Collins – background vocals ("Unwritten")
J. Curtis – guitar ("Size Matters")
Nick Lashley – guitar, keyboards
Wayne Wilkins – piano, keyboards
Chris Brown – bass ("If You're Gonna...")
Paul Herman – guitar ("I Bruise Easily")
Wayne Rodrigues – keyboards, turntables
Andrew Frampton – guitar, keyboards, programming, producer, vocal arrangements, string arrangements
Simon Hill – drums ("If You're Gonna...")
Andrew Duckles – viola ("Peace of Me")
Tony Hodson – guitar ("Drop Me in the Middle")
Paul Stanborough – additional guitars ("Silent Movie")
Steve Kipner – producer, vocal arrangements
Joe Chiccarelli – engineer
John Hill – producer
Nick Ingman – string arrangements, string conductor
Patrick Leonard – programming, producer
Steve MacMillan – engineer
Herb Powers – mastering
Greg Wells – programming, producer
Gavyn Wright – string conductor
Suzie Katayama	– string contractor
Nick Lashley – producer, engineer
David Channing – digital editing
Michael Perfitt – engineer, digital editing
Ryan Freeland – engineer
James Cruz – mastering
Wayne Wilkins – programming, producer, engineer, vocal arrangements, string arrangements
Ian Cuttler – art direction
Richard Flack – producer, engineer, drum programming
Robbie Campos – vocal arrangements, string arrangements
Wayne Rodrigues – producer, engineer, digital editing, vocal arrangements, drum programming, Pro-Tools
Michelle Holme – art direction
Kieron Menzies – engineer
Chris Steffen – engineer
Peter Wade Keusch – producer
Lee Groves – mixing programmer
Michael Tafaro – producer, vocal arrangements
Nathan Winkler – producer, vocal arrangements

Charts

Weekly charts

Year-end charts

Certifications

Release history

References

External links
Peter Wade Music – Producer Peter Wade Keusch

2004 debut albums
Albums produced by Greg Wells
Albums produced by Patrick Leonard
Natasha Bedingfield albums